is a Japanese fantasy light novel series written by Meguru Seto and illustrated by Note Takehana. It began serialization online in January 2017 on the user-generated novel publishing website Shōsetsuka ni Narō. It was later acquired by Kodansha, who have published six volumes since August 2017 under their Kodansha Ranobe Books imprint. A manga adaptation with art by Tomoyuki Hino has been serialized via Kodansha's Niconico-based Suiyōbi no Sirius manga service since 2018. It has been collected in ten tankōbon volumes. Both the light novel and manga are licensed in North America by Seven Seas Entertainment. An anime television series adaptation by Okuruto Noboru aired from January to March 2021 on the Animeism programming block.

Synopsis
Hidden dungeons are a place of legends where rare treasures and items are concealed. Some are lucky to find them, like Noir Stardia, the third son of a minor noble family, who acquires an exceptional skill that provides him great knowledge. As a result, however, it causes him to have painful headaches. Noir is given a job offer by his childhood friend Emma Brightness, who has a cure for his headaches. After Noir encounters difficulty with employment, he wishes to become an adventurer and finds a dungeon and the legendary adventurer, Olivia Servant, who has been trapped inside for centuries. Olivia gives Noir three powerful skills, which he uses to improve his power and enroll at the Hero Academy.

Characters

Noir is the third son of a baronet, a noble of the lowest rank, who is a self proclaimed coward who would like to take it easy. Upon not receiving a job as a librarian due to interference from more prominent nobles, Noir begins his journey to become a hero seeking other employment through attending the adventurer's/hero academy. He is originally born with the rare [Great Sage] Skill, which grants him unlimited knowledge for a time, but gives him terrible headaches after each use, so he refrains from using it until he learns from Emma that kissing (her) helps alleviate some of the pain. During an exploration of a secret dungeon, he meets Olivia, who bestows him the power to freely upgrade his and other people's powers [Create], [Bestow], and [Edit] by expending LP (Life Points), which are obtained by having joyful experiences but at the risk of dying if his LP is fully depleted.

Emma is the daughter of a baron/baroness and a childhood friend to Noir. Her specialty is using twin daggers during melee combat and wind magic. She treats everyone around her equally with a kind heart. Emma willingly allows Noir to kiss her, which helps relieve his [Great Sage] aftereffects. She initially started a part-time job as a librarian to work beside Noir only to find he did not get it and then quits shortly afterward to take the heroes exam with Noir just to stay by his side. 

Lola is the gorgeous receptionist at the adventurer's guild Odin. As the person in charge of Noir, she arranges various quests for him to go on. Despite her calm demeanor, Lola has a competitive streak and considers Emma, who is close to Noir, to be her rival.

Olivia was a top-tier adventurer who worked 200 years ago. She became trapped in a labyrinth by a trap (Death Chains) after attempting to conquer a hidden dungeon. She becomes Noir's master when they meet, helping him to grow stronger in hopes that one day he can become powerful enough to break her free.

Luna is a half-elf saintess/cleric who is Lola's best friend. She is introduced into the story as a solution towards solving the curse of a duke's daughter who happens to go to same adventurer's school as Noir and Emma. As a famous cleric, her skills are quite unique with her being one of very few with curse purification skills; it initially shortened her lifespan, but Noir alters it to instead decrease Luna's finances. After her short adventure together with Noir on purifying the curse, she develops a crush on Noir, to the dismay of Emma and Lola.

Noir's younger sister. The youngest of four siblings, she has a brother complex towards Noir.

Media

Light novel
Originally serialized as a web novel on Shōsetsuka ni Narō, Kodansha published the first volume of the light novel series in print on August 1, 2017 under their Kodansha Ranobe Books imprint. The series is licensed in North America by Seven Seas Entertainment.

Manga
A manga adaptation by Tomoyuki Hino began serialization on Kodansha's Niconico-based Suiyōbi no Sirius manga service in 2018, with the first  tankōbon volume released on December 6, 2018. Seven Seas Entertainment has also licensed the manga and published the first volume on November 17, 2020.

Chapters not yet in tankōbon format

Anime
An anime television series adaptation was announced by Kodansha on May 8, 2020. The series was animated by Okuruto Noboru and directed by Kenta Ōnishi, with Kenta Ihara handling series composition, and Yuya Uetake designing the characters. The series aired from January 9 to March 27, 2021 on the Animeism block on MBS, TBS, BS-TBS, and AT-X, with Crunchyroll streaming the series outside of Asia. In Southeast Asia, Bilibili streamed the series. The opening theme song is  performed by Spira Spica, while the ending theme song is  performed by COALAMODE. The series ran for 12 episodes. On February 8, 2021, Crunchyroll announced the series would receive an English dub, which premiered on February 26.

Notes

References

External links
  at Shōsetsuka ni Narō 
  
  
  
 

2017 Japanese novels
2021 anime television series debuts
Anime and manga based on light novels
Animeism
Crunchyroll anime
Fantasy anime and manga
Harem anime and manga
Kodansha books
Kodansha manga
Light novels
Light novels first published online
Okuruto Noboru
Seven Seas Entertainment titles
Shōnen manga
Shōsetsuka ni Narō